The Man from Texas is a 1948 American Western film starring James Craig and Lynn Bari. The film was directed by Leigh Jason, with Earl Robinson serving as the film composer. It is credited as being based on the 1938 play and novel Missouri Legend by Elizabeth Beall Ginty  that was based on Jesse James. It was produced by Bryan Foy for Eagle-Lion Films. The film's sets were designed by the art director Edward L. Ilou.

Plot
Tobias Simms leads two lives, as a husband and father and as the outlaw called the El Paso Kid. He is of two minds whether to be an honest self supporting father or an outlaw. He compromises by using the skills of the latter to lead a life as the former.

Cast
James Craig as Tobias Simms - alias Toby Heath AKA The El Paso Kid
Lynn Bari as Zee Simms - alias Zee Heath AKA Maw
Johnnie Johnston as Billy Taylor 
Una Merkel as Widow Weeks
Wallace Ford as Jed 
Harry Davenport as "Pop" Hickey
Sara Allgood as Aunt Belle
Reed Hadley as Marshal Gregg

References

External links

The Man from Texas at BFI

1948 films
1948 Western (genre) films
American Western (genre) films
Films scored by Earl Robinson
Films directed by Leigh Jason
Eagle-Lion Films films
American black-and-white films
American films based on plays
1940s English-language films
1940s American films